Muhammad Salman Naeem (born 1 February 1993) is a Pakistani politician who had been a member of the Provincial Assembly of the Punjab from 15 August 2018 to 23 May 2022. He was de-seated due to vote against party policy.

Early life 
He was born on 1 February 1993 in Vehari.

Political career

He was elected to the Provincial Assembly of the Punjab as an independent candidate from Constituency PP-217 (Multan-VII) in 2018 Pakistani general election.

He fought the election against the Vice Chairman of PTI Shah Mahmood Qureshi and defeated him with a big margin of votes as an Independent Candidate. Shah Mahmood was also a strong candidate for the Chief Minister Of Punjab in the 2018 election but after his defeat, he was out of the race.

He joined Pakistan Tehreek-e-Insaf (PTI) following his election due to the party's position in Punjab and with the support of Jehangir Khan Tareen.

On 11 September 2018, he was inducted into the provincial Punjab cabinet of Chief Minister Usman Buzdar and was appointed as special assistant to the Chief Minister on transport.

On 1 October 2018, he was disqualified by the Election Commission of Pakistan as member of the Punjab Assembly after he was found underage. On 12 October, an Election Tribunal of High Court suspended the disqualification of Naeem after he filed a petition to challenge his disqualification against the decision of the Election Commission.

A three-member bench of the Supreme Court of Pakistan reinstated MPA Muhammad Salman Naeem from Multan. The Supreme Court annulled the decision of the Election Commission of Pakistan against the disqualification of Muhammad Salman Naeem.

He also served in the Punjab Government cabinet regarding Transport. He de-seated due to vote against party policy for Chief Minister of Punjab election  on 16 April 2022.

Being a dissident PTI MP, he ran on the rival PMNn ticket in the by-election of July 17, 2022 and was defeated by Zain Mehmood Quraishi, (son of Shah Mehmood Quraishi), in a flood of public opinion that was grossly against the actions of dissident members, throughout Punjab.

References

Living people
Pakistan Tehreek-e-Insaf MPAs (Punjab)
Punjab MPAs 2018–2023
1993 births